Morgenstond Dam is an earth-fill type dam located on the Ngwempisi River, near Amsterdam, Mpumalanga, South Africa. It was established in 1978 and has been renovated in 1991. The dams main purpose is to serve for municipal and industrial use. Its hazard potential has been ranked high (3).

See also
List of reservoirs and dams in South Africa
List of rivers of South Africa

References 

 List of South African Dams from the Department of Water Affairs and Forestry (South Africa)

Dams in South Africa
Dams completed in 1978